The building designed by Sam Scorer at Markham Moor services (sometimes known as the Markham Moor Petrol Station, Markham Moor Hypar or Markham Moor Papilo) is a Grade II listed building originally designed as a petrol station. It is located on the A1 south-bound at the Markham Moor junction services and was built between 1959 and 1960 with the aid of engineer Dr Kalman Hajnal-Kónyi. It is currently a Starbucks.

Design 
Designed by Lincoln-based architect Sam Scorer, the original structure consisted only of hyperbolic paraboloid - to serve as a petrol station: the building underneath was a later addition. The petrol station was one of a series of buildings designed by Scorer which included hyperbolic structures. These structures (sometimes known as "Hypars") were experimental structures with the intention of making them appear to hover and also in this case a show of engineering efficiency, since the concrete roof structure is only 75mm thick.

The cantilever canopy is constructed using a shell concrete structure which forms a continuous plane developed from two parabolas inverted relative to each other at right angles. The canopy thus acts as two systems of arches with one set of arches under compression and the other under tension.

History

Ownership

Petrol station 
The building was originally designed and built as a petrol station; it was operated by National Benzole from 1960 until it was taken over by Little Chef in 1989. While the canopy was designed as an architectural curiosity, it was also designed to catch the eye of a motorist, giving them plenty of time to pull into the petrol station.

Little Chef 
In 1989 the structure was converted to a Little Chef restaurant, and the building beneath the canopy was built. In 2003 the Highways Agency proposed plans for a flyover which would involve the demolition of the Little Chef, however the plans were later revised. The Little Chef on this site closed in 2012.

Interim years 
The building was abandoned between 2012 and 2019. On 27 March 2012, shortly after the Little Chef restaurant closed, Historic England awarded the building a Grade II listed status.

Starbucks 
In 2019 the site was taken over by Starbucks. The building and roof were renovated and converted into a drive-through.

Threat of Demolition 
In 2003 the Highways Agency proposed a junction improvement which involved the construction of a flyover necessitating the demolition of the building. However, after many objections from the residents of nearby Elkesley and those interested in the welfare of the building, the plans were revised, including improved access to the site.

References

External links 
Images of the original petrol station:

 https://englishbuildings.blogspot.com/2020/06/markham-moor-nottinghamshire.html
 https://flickr.com/photos/nedtrifle/3657463823

Historic filling stations in the United Kingdom
A1 road (Great Britain)
Bassetlaw District